The A84 is a major road in Scotland, United Kingdom. It links the city of Stirling with Lochearnhead, running an approximate .

Road safety
The A84 between M9 Junction 10 and Lochearnhead has a poor road safety record, according to EuroRAP.  In its June 2008 GB Tracking Results, the Road Safety Foundation reported that the 44 km single carriageway stretch featured 29 fatal and serious injury accidents between 2003 and 2005.

References

8-0084
8-0084